Ričardas Nekriošius (born 12 September 1986) is a Lithuanian canoeist.

In 2015 he and Andrej Olijnik finished at 7th place in World Championships and qualified for the 2016 Summer Olympics.

References

External links

Lithuanian male canoeists
1986 births
Living people
Canoeists at the 2015 European Games
European Games competitors for Lithuania
Canoeists at the 2016 Summer Olympics
Olympic canoeists of Lithuania
ICF Canoe Sprint World Championships medalists in kayak
Canoeists at the 2019 European Games